Marie-Françoise Clergeau (born 2 May 1948 in Nantes) was a member of the National Assembly of France. She represented  Loire-Atlantique's 2nd constituency from 1997 to 2017, as a member of the Socialiste, radical, citoyen et divers gauche. On 29 January 2013 she was a major speaker on to the French National Assembly urging the vote for Marriage Equality.

References

1948 births
Living people
Politicians from Nantes
Socialist Party (France) politicians
Women members of the National Assembly (France)
Deputies of the 11th National Assembly of the French Fifth Republic
Deputies of the 12th National Assembly of the French Fifth Republic
Deputies of the 13th National Assembly of the French Fifth Republic
Deputies of the 14th National Assembly of the French Fifth Republic
21st-century French women politicians
20th-century French women politicians